Simon Burick (June 14, 1909 – December 10, 1986) was a sports editor and featured columnist for the Dayton Daily News for 58 years.

Biography
Burick was an Ohio radio personality as early as 1935, when he became WHIO's first sportscaster. His daily 15-minute programs aired until 1961. Burick also hosted the Cincinnati Reds pre-game show before home games. In 1949, when WHIO-TV went on the air, Burick was one of its featured personalities and continued to be so for 10 years.

Burick authored three books, Alston and the Dodgers in 1966, The Main Spark, a biography of Sparky Anderson, in 1978, and Byline, a collection of his columns, in 1982.

Honors
Burick was voted the J. G. Taylor Spink Award by the Baseball Writers' Association of America (BBWAA) in late 1982, and in July 1983 was honored at ceremonies at the National Baseball Hall of Fame in Cooperstown, New York. He became the first writer from a city without a Major League Baseball team to be so honored at the Hall of Fame.

Burick was inducted to the National Sportscasters and Sportswriters Association Hall of Fame in 1985. In 1986, he received the Red Smith Award from the Associated Press Sports Editors (APSE), given annually to a single honoree for "major contributions to sports journalism".

References

External links
Baseball Hall of Fame

1909 births
1986 deaths
Sportswriters from Ohio
Baseball writers
BBWAA Career Excellence Award recipients
Dayton Daily News
Red Smith Award recipients
20th-century American non-fiction writers
Sportspeople from Dayton, Ohio
American sportswriters
Journalists from Ohio
20th-century American journalists
American male journalists
20th-century American male writers